Parapiesma is a genus of true bugs belonging to the family Piesmatidae.

The species of this genus are found in Europe and Northern America.

Species:
 Parapiesma atriplicis (Frey-Gessner, 1863) 
 Parapiesma cinereum (Say, 1832)

References

Piesmatidae